The siege of Pyongyang was a military conflict fought between the allied Ming-Joseon army and the Japanese First Division under Konishi Yukinaga. The battle ended in victory for the allies but a successful retreat from Pyeongyang by the remaining Japanese in the night of 8 February 1593.

Background 
A minor Ming force of 5,000 under Wu Weizhong arrived at the Yalu River on 5 January.

The Ming army of 35,000 under Li Rusong arrived at the Yalu River on 26 January. They were then joined by the advance force and a bodyguard unit sent to protect Seonjo of Joseon, raising their strength to 43,000, another 10,000 Koreans at Sunan under Yi Il, and finally 4,200 monks under Hyujeong.

Li Rusong sent ahead the envoy Shen Weijing to negotiate with Konishi Yukinaga, however this act was insincere. He had no intention of negotiating with the Japanese. Konishi sent 20 men to greet the Ming envoys, but most of them did not return. It's not certain what happened to them. One version of events state that they were killed during a banquet with Shen Weijing, another says they were simply ambushed on the way.

During the march to Pyeongyang they encountered a Japanese scout party, three of whom were captured, and five killed. The allied army arrived at Pyeongyang and set up camp north of the city on 5 February 1593.

Konishi offered to hold negotiations but was refused. That night some 800 Japanese sneaked out and attacked the Ming camp, however they were spotted by guards and driven back by fire arrows, suffering 30 casualties.

Battle

The battle began on 6 February 1593. Hyujeong's monks with support from Wu Weizhong attacked the large hill north of Pyeongyang where around 2,000 enemy troops were stationed under Konishi Yukinaga. Konishi was almost surrounded at one point until Sō Yoshitoshi counterattacked and rescued him. The fighting lasted for two days before the last Japanese commander, Matsuura Shigenobu, was forced to pull back to Pyeongyang. The monks suffered 600 casualties and Wu Weizhong was wounded in the chest by a bullet.

In the morning of 8 January, Li Rusong's army advanced on the city, their tightly packed ranks "looking like the scales on a fish." Yang Yuan and Zhang Shijue attacked from the north and west, Li Rubai from the southeast, and Yi Il and Gim Eungso from the southwest. The east was covered by the Daedong River and could not be attacked.

Once the signal cannon fired, they rushed the walls with ladders, shot fire arrows and threw bombs into the city, and started pounding the gates with cannons. The Japanese defense was almost too much. Li Rusong's own horse was shot out from under him and the assault began to show signs of faltering before Li went forward, cut off the head of a retreating soldier, and offered 5,000 taels to the first man over the wall. The allied troops renewed their assault until Luo Shangzhi was able to clear the wall and Yang Yuan followed by breaking through the northern gate. In the west the surviving monks and troops from the earlier attack joined Zhang Shijue's push into the city once the gate had been destroyed by cannons.

The Japanese pulled back to their last line of defense, an earth and log fort in the northern corner of Pyeongyang. Li Rusong instructed his troops to set the building on fire using fire arrows, but even so the Japanese could not be dislodged. Instead the crush of allied  soldiers and cavalry suffered horrendous casualties to Japanese gunfire. Unable to move forward, many retreated through the western gate. Seeing this, Konishi chose to go on the offensive and sortied out with his men, only to be driven back by cannon fire.

Unwilling to suffer any more casualties, Li Rusong called off the attack as night approached.

Although nominally successful in repelling the enemies, the Japanese were no longer capable of defending the city. All the gates had been breached, no food was left, and they had suffered horrible casualties. With this in mind Konishi led the entire garrison out into the night and snuck across the frozen Daedong River back to Hanseong. Many drowned during the crossing.

Aftermath
The Japanese retreat was hard. Aside from natural hardships, an ambush by Zha Dashou and Li Ning also claimed another 362 Japanese lives. Konishi's men reached Hanseong on 17 February.

After the Japanese loss at Pyeongyang, Kuroda Yoshitaka called for the removal of Konishi Yukinaga, saying that he was a poor leader and did not get along with his fellow commanders. Konishi, in turn, became the primary advocate for peace on the Japanese side, having suffered one of the heaviest losses during the campaign.

Song Yingchang invited Seonjo of Joseon to return to Pyeongyang on 6 March.

See also
List of battles during the Japanese invasions of Korea (1592–1598)
Siege of Pyongyang (1592)

Citations

Bibliography

 
 
 
 
 
 
 
 
 
 
 桑田忠親 [Kuwata, Tadachika], ed., 舊參謀本部編纂, [Kyu Sanbo Honbu], 朝鮮の役 [Chousen no Eki]　(日本の戰史 [Nihon no Senshi] Vol. 5), 1965.
 
 
 
 
 
 
 
 
 
 
 
 
  
 
 
 
 
 
 

Pyongyang
History of Pyongyang
1593 in Asia
1593 in Japan
Pyongyang
Pyongyang